No. 44 Squadron ( or LLv.44, from 3 May 1942 Le.Lv.44), renamed No. 44 Bomber Squadron (Finnish: Pommituslentolaivue 44 or PLe.Lv.44 on 14 February 1944), was a bomber squadron of the Finnish Air Force during World War II. The squadron was part of Flying Regiment 4.

Organization

Winter War
1st Flight (1. Lentue)
2nd Flight (2. Lentue)
3rd Flight (3. Lentue)

The Squadron was equipped with 8 Bristol Blenheim Is and 1 Douglas DC-2.

Continuation War
1st Flight (1. Lentue)
2nd Flight (2. Lentue)
3rd Flight (3. Lentue)
4th Flight (4. Lentue)
Detachment Räty (Osasto Räty)
Detachment Malinen (Osasto Malinen)

The equipment consisted of 8 Bristol Blenheim Mk.Is and some Mk.IVs, 3 Junkers K 43, 1 Blackburn Ripon IIF, 1 Heinkel He 115, and 14 Junkers Ju 88s.

Bibliography

External links
Lentolaivue 44

44